Elihu Doty (20 September 1809 – 30 November 1864) was an American missionary to China. He was responsible for the first textbook of Southern Min in English. Along with John Van Nest Talmage he is credited with the invention of Pe̍h-ōe-jī, the most common orthography used to write Southern Min, although some doubt remains as to the exact origins of this system.

Early mission
Doty arrived in Batavia (now Jakarta) in the Dutch East Indies in 1836 and spent his first three years as a missionary there; Azubah Caroline Condit was among those who accompanied him on his journey there. His next station was Borneo, from 1839 to 1844, at which point he relocated to Amoy (now Xiamen) in Fujian, China.

Mission in Amoy
It was while stationed in Amoy that Doty produced the Anglo Chinese Manual of the Amoy Dialect (1853), which was "the earliest existing textbook for a Southern Min dialect".

Publications

Notes

References

External links
Complete version of his Anglo-Chinese Manual

Protestant missionaries in China
1809 births
1864 deaths
American Protestant missionaries
People from Berne, New York
Protestant missionaries in Indonesia
Missionary linguists
American expatriates in China
American expatriates in Indonesia